Paris Psaltis (born 12 November 1996) is a Cypriot professional footballer who plays as a right back for Cypriot First Division club Omonia and the Cyprus national team.

International career
He made his debut for Cyprus national football team on 27 March 2021 in a World Cup qualifier against Croatia.

Career statistics

Club

Honours
 Omonia
Cypriot Cup: 2021–22
Cypriot Super Cup: 2021

References

External links
Paris Psaltis at Football Database

1996 births
Living people
Cypriot footballers
Aris Limassol FC players
Cypriot First Division players
Association football defenders
Greek Cypriot people
APOEL FC players
Sportspeople from Nicosia
Olympiakos Nicosia players
Cyprus under-21 international footballers
Cyprus international footballers